Alice Chan Wai (born 21 November 1973) is a Hong Kong actress currently contracted to TVB.

Early life 
Alice Chan was born in Beijing, with ancestry in the county-level city of Puning in Guangdong. She settled in Hong Kong with her parents and elder sister when she was one-and-a-half years old. After graduating high school, she attended Chu Hai College of Higher Education. She stopped after two years of study to enter the Miss Asia 1996 beauty pageant at 22 years old.

Career 
Chan began her television and acting career after winning the Miss Asia 1996 beauty pageant. She signed a management contract with Asia Television (ATV) that same year, and began filming her first television production. Chan quickly became one of the most popular actresses in ATV, alongside Joey Meng, Kristal Tin and Kristy Yang. In 2005, she gained recognition for her leading role of a series that was loosely based on the late actress Anita Mui.

Chan retired from the industry after marrying the Taiwanese businessman James Yen. In 2012, after divorcing with Yen, Chan returned to acting and signed an artiste contract with TVB.

In 2018, Chan earned critical acclaim with her role as the villainous Princess Taiping in the period drama Deep in the Realm of Conscience and won the Most Popular Female Character award at the 2018 TVB Anniversary Awards.

Personal life
In 2008, Chan married Taiwanese businessman James Yen. They divorced in 2012. In 2019, Chan was spotted dating with a doctor. She later admitted that she was in a new relationship with a doctor named Aldous Chan. On 22 November 2021, Chan announced her engagement with her boyfriend. On 26 September 2022, the couple held their wedding in The Peninsula Hotel in Tsim Sha Tsui.

Chan is good friends with Wonder Women co-actresses Miriam Yeung and Rebecca Zhu.

Filmography

Television dramas (ATV)

Television dramas (TVB)

Television dramas (Shaw Brothers Studio)

Film
1997: 97 Lan Kwai Fong
1999: Dial D for Demons
2000: Guilty or Not
2000: A Wicked Ghost II: The Fear
2000: Phantom Call
2000: Bio-Cops
2000: Ransom Express
2001: City of Desire
2006: Wise Guys Never Die
2007: The Lady Iron Chef
2013: Hardcore Comedy
2014: Iceman
2016: Buddy Cops
2019: The Fallen
TBA: Endless Battle

Awards & Nominations

1996
 Miss Asia beauty pageant

2015
TVB Anniversary Award for Best Actress Nomination — Lord of Shanghai
TVB Anniversary Award for Most Popular Female Character Top 5 Nomination — Lord of Shanghai

2016
 StarHub TVB Award for My Favourite Female Characters — Lord of Shanghai
 StarHub TVB Award for My Favourite Supporting Actress — Lord of Shanghai
TVB Anniversary Award for Best Actress Nomination — My Dangerous Mafia Retirement Plan
TVB Anniversary Award for Most Popular Female Character Nomination — My Dangerous Mafia Retirement Plan
TVB Anniversary Award for Best Show Host Nomination — Wai Gor's Wok

2017
TVB Anniversary Award for Best Supporting Actress Nomination — Line Walker: The Prelude

2018
TVB Anniversary Award for Best Actress Top 5 Nomination — Deep in the Realm of Conscience
 TVB Anniversary Award for Most Popular Female Character — Deep in the Realm of Conscience
 TVB Anniversary Gala for Favourite TVB Actress in Singapore Nomination — Deep in the Realm of Conscience
 TVB Anniversary Gala for Favourite TVB Actress in Malaysia Nomination — Deep in the Realm of Conscience
Hong Kong Television Award for Best Leading Actress in Drama Series Top 5 Nomination — Deep in the Realm of Conscience

2019
TVB Anniversary Award for Best Actress Nomination — As Time Goes By
 TVB Anniversary Award for Most Popular Female Character Nomination — Wonder Women

2020
TVB Anniversary Award for Best Actress Nomination — Forensic Heroes IV
TVB Anniversary Award for Most Popular Female Character Nomination — Forensic Heroes IV
TVB Anniversary Award for Favourite TVB Actress in Malaysia Nomination — Forensic Heroes IV

2021
TVB Anniversary Award for Best Supporting Actress Top 10 Nomination — Murder Diary

2022
TVB Anniversary Award for Best Actress Top 10 Nomination — Communion
TVB Anniversary Award for Best Actress Nomination — Against Darkness
TVB Anniversary Award for Most Popular Female Character Nomination — Communion and Against Darkness
TVB Anniversary Award for Favourite TVB Actress in Malaysia Top 10 Nomination — Communion
TVB Anniversary Award for Favourite TVB Actress in Malaysia Nomination — Against Darkness
TVB Anniversary Award for Most Popular Onscreen Partnership Nomination — Communion (with Roger Kwok)

References

External links
 
 
 

1973 births
Living people
Hong Kong film actresses
Hong Kong television presenters
Hong Kong women television presenters
TVB actors
Hong Kong television actresses
Actresses from Shanghai
Chinese film actresses
Chinese television actresses
20th-century Chinese actresses
21st-century Chinese actresses
20th-century Hong Kong actresses
21st-century Hong Kong actresses